Epper Passage Provincial Park is a provincial park in British Columbia, Canada, located on the north side of Vargas Island in the Clayoquot Sound region of the West Coast of Vancouver Island. Also on Vargas Island is Vargas Island Provincial Park. Other provincial parks nearby are Flores Island Marine Provincial Park, Gibson Marine Provincial Park, Maquinna Marine Provincial Park, Sydney Inlet Provincial Park, Dawley Passage Provincial Park and Hesquiat Peninsula Provincial Park.

See also
Pacific Rim National Park

References

BC Parks infopage

Clayoquot Sound region
Provincial parks of British Columbia
1995 establishments in British Columbia
Protected areas established in 1995